3D World was an Australian street press publication for the dance music community.

After being founded in Sydney in 1989,  ownership of the publication changed hands several times before publication shut down in 2011.

It was superseded by Three Magazine, another publication by Street Press Australia Pty Ltd, which "was born out of the ashes of 3D World" in August 2011.

Dance Music Awards
3DWorld Publishing also founded the Dance Music Awards (DMA) to recognise achievements by musicians in dance music as well as hip-hop, which was then considered underground.

Nominees in each category were selected by a panel from the music industry, and then voted on by the general public to determine the winners. Awards ceremonies featured DJ set performances from various artists, such as DJ Ajax.

By 2006, it was regarded as "Australia's longest running, biggest and best dance music awards."

References

1989 establishments in Australia
2011 disestablishments in Australia
Dance magazines
Defunct magazines published in Australia
Magazines established in 1989
Magazines disestablished in 2011
Magazines published in Sydney
Music magazines published in Australia
Weekly magazines published in Australia